Thula Kekana (13 April 1956 – 25 March 2015), known by his stage name Senyaka, was a South African rapper. He was born to Moses Kekana, political activist within Pan Africanist Congress of Azania and involved the 1950s Evaton bus boycotts. His stage name "Senyaka", meaning "blob of jelly", was given to him by his aunt, after being impressed and amused by his chubby appearance after he was born.

He rose to fame in the 1980s for his hit single "Go Away" and he is credited as being South Africa's first rapper and one of the first African rappers. Former Radio Sesotho DJ Thuso Motaung, praises Senyaka for his creative, said: "he laughs, and say, that boy when you interviewed him, you have to be extra careful, be on your toes, and pay attention to what he says, coz if you relax, unsavory words and vulgar will be said on your show that can cost your job, that boy used too much vulgar and he just didn't give a damn. It was the character in him."

In the early 90s Senyaka dissed Brenda Fassie in some of his songs for turning him down e.g. "Magents", saying Brenda doesn't feel "Really OGs" and "Brenda ke mpara" (Brenda is dumb) and she responded by calling him "sgatla mabhanti" (vagabond, you take me take me for granted). Senyaka was known to be humorous and he extended his humor in most of his songs. His friendship with Chicco led two of them make a comedic movie, "Moruti wa Tsotsi", with Senyaka being the actor and Chicco the producer of the movie.

Like many individuals with the surname "Kekana", Senyaka hails from Sibitiela (popularly known as Zebediela).

References 

1957 births
2015 deaths
South African male actors